is a women's football club playing in Japan's football league, Nadeshiko Div. 1. Its hometown is the city of Matsuyama, Ehime.

Squad

Current squad

Results

References

External links 
 
 Ehime F.C. Ladies official site
 Japanese Club Teams

Ehime FC
Women's football clubs in Japan
2012 establishments in Japan
Sports teams in Ehime Prefecture